PVA may refer to:

Science and technology
 Paraventricular nucleus of hypothalamus, a part of the brain 
 Patterned vertical alignment, a thin-film-transistor liquid-crystal display technology
 Poikiloderma vasculare atrophicans, a skin disease
 Polyvinyl acetate, an adhesive used for porous materials like wood, paper, and cloth
 Polyvinyl alcohol, a water-soluble synthetic polymer
 Population viability analysis, a risk-assessment method used in conservation biology
 Positive vorticity advection in meteorology
 Potato virus A, an agricultural disease

Other uses
 Paralyzed Veterans of America, a veterans' service organization
 Kinder High School for the Performing and Visual Arts, in Houston, Texas, U.S.
 Perkiomen Valley Academy, in Pennsylvania, U.S.
 People's Volunteer Army, the Chinese armed forces active during the Korean War
 El Embrujo Airport, in Providencia Island, Colombia, IATA code PVA
 PVA (band), a disco-punk band from London

See also